Mask of Murder is a 1985 Swedish-American film directed by Arne Mattsson, about a serial killer in a small Canadian town.

Plot
In a Canadian town, women are being killed by a serial murderer.

Cast
Rod Taylor as Supt. Bob McLaine
Valerie Perrine as Marianne McLaine
Christopher Lee as Chief Supt. Jonathan Rich
Sam Cook as Supt. Ray Cooper
Terrence Hardiman as Dr. Paul Crossland
Heinz Hopf as Carlos
Christine McKenna as Vicky Moore
Cyd Hayman as Child Psychologist
Hjördis Petterson as Ida Swanson

Production
The movie was shot in Sweden.

References

External links

Mask of Murder at Swedish Film Database

1985 films
English-language Swedish films
Films directed by Arne Mattsson
1980s serial killer films
Films set in Canada
1980s English-language films
1980s Swedish films